Lakha may refer to:

 Lakha language, a Southern Tibetic language spoken in central Bhutan
 Lakha of Mewar, the third Maharana of the Mewar Kingdom
 Lakha, a 1997 Bollywood film